The discography of Domo Genesis, an American hip hop recording artist, consists of one studio album two collaborative albums, one compilation album, one extended play, seven mixtapes, 4 singles (including 2 as a featured artist), 2 music videos.

Albums

Studio albums

Collaborative albums

Extended plays

Mixtapes

Singles

As lead artist

As featured artist

Guest appearances

Music videos

References

Hip hop discographies
Discographies of American artists